Taraconica is a genus of moths of the family Erebidae. The genus was erected by Emilio Berio in 1959.

The species of this genus are found in Madagascar.

Taraconica aurea Viette, 1968
Taraconica berioi Viette, 1965
Taraconica betsimisaraka Viette, 1965
Taraconica bojeri Viette, 1982
Taraconica humberti Viette, 1965
Taraconica isekaly Viette, 1982
Taraconica novogonia (Berio, 1956)
Taraconica pauliani Viette, 1982
Taraconica transversa Berio, 1959
Taraconica vadonae Viette, 1985

References

Boletobiinae
Noctuoidea genera